In enzymology, a quercitrinase is an enzyme that catalyzes the chemical reaction

quercitrin + H2O  L-rhamnose + quercetin

Thus, the two substrates of this enzyme are quercitrin and H2O, whereas its two products are L-rhamnose and quercetin.

This enzyme belongs to the family of hydrolases, specifically those glycosidases that hydrolyse O- and S-glycosyl compounds.  The systematic name of this enzyme class is quercitrin 3-L-rhamnohydrolase.

The enzyme can be found in Aspergillus flavus. It is an enzyme in the rutin catabolic pathway.

References

Further reading 

 

EC 3.2.1
Enzymes of unknown structure
Quercetin glycosides